Magda Julin (née Mauroy, 24 July 1894 – 21 December 1990) was a Swedish figure skater who competed in ladies' singles. She was the 1920 Olympic champion, a two-time Nordic champion, and a three-time Swedish national champion. She was four months pregnant at the 1920 Olympics.

Life and career 
Julin was a daughter of the French music producer Edouard Mauroy. The family moved to Sweden when she was 7 years old. She worked as a waitress and later ran a café and then a restaurant until 1971. She was married to the sea captain F. E. Julin, who was 15 years older. She had two sons and spent her last years in a nursing home in Stockholm. At the age of 90, she continued to skate at the public open air ice rink in Kungsträdgården in central Stockholm. She participated in the inauguration of an ice rink in Östersund in autumn 1990.

Results

References

Further reading

External links

People from Vichy
1894 births
1990 deaths
Swedish female single skaters
Figure skaters at the 1920 Summer Olympics
Olympic gold medalists for Sweden
Olympic figure skaters of Sweden
Olympic medalists in figure skating
French emigrants to Sweden

Medalists at the 1920 Summer Olympics
Sportspeople from Allier
20th-century Swedish women